Devgadhbariya is one of the 182 Legislative Assembly constituencies of Gujarat state in India. It is part of Dahod district.

List of segments
This assembly seat represents the following segments,

 Devgadh Baria Taluka – Entire taluka except village – Gamdi.

 Dhanpur Taluka (Part) Villages – Ghodajar, Umariya, Budhpur, Bor, Mahunala, Surpur (Umariya), Mandav, Dolariya, Kanzar, Agasvani, Pipodra, Chorbariya, Bedat, Bogadva, Nakti, Bhorva, Sajoi, Kaliyavad, Undar, Dudhamali, Adalwada, Kothariya, Rampur, Modhva, Nalu, Pav, Raiyavan, Khokhbed, Ved, Ghada, Khokhra, Lukhadiya, Pipearo, Singawali, Dhanpur (To), Simamoi, Vakasiya, Kundawada, Taramkach, Dabhava, Lakhana Gojiya, Tokarva, Dungarpur (To), Nan Salai, Chari, Limdi Medhari, Pipariya (To), Gadvel, Andarpura, Gumli (To), Udhal Mahuda.

Members of Legislative Assembly

Election candidate

2022

Election results

2017

2012

See also
 List of constituencies of the Gujarat Legislative Assembly
 Dahod district

References

External links
 

Assembly constituencies of Gujarat
Dahod district